Trudering-Riem (Central Bavarian: Trudaring-Ream) is the 15th borough (Stadtbezirk) of Munich, Bavaria, consisting of the quarters (Stadtteile) Trudering and Riem. This area is the former location of Munich's old airport, Riem Airport.

Location 

In the north the borough borders Bogenhausen, in the west the borough borders Berg am Laim, in the south Ramersdorf-Perlach, and in the east the municipalities Aschheim, Feldkirchen, Haar and Putzbrunn (belonging to the Munich district).

The population is distributed roughly as follows: Trudering 56.000 and Riem 20.000.

There are the following subdistricts:

 Gartenstadt Trudering
 Kirchtrudering
 Messestadt Riem
 Moosfeld
 Neutrudering
 Riem
 Straßtrudering
 Waldtrudering

The old village center of Riem is situated around the church of St. Martin that lies in the street Martin-Empl-Ring. The old village center of Kirchtrudering is situated around the church St. Peter and Paul in the Kirchtruderinger Straße and the one of Straßtrudering at the junction of Truderinger Straße and Bajuwarenstraße.

The municipality of Trudering was formed in 1818 by merging the villages of Kirchtrudering and Straßtrudering. At the beginning of the 20th century, new settlements emerged in the municipal area, such as Gartenstadt (garden city) Trudering, Waldtrudering and Neutrudering. Trudering is a part of Munich since 1932. Riem is a part of Munich since 1937.

Literature 

 Willibald Karl (Hrsg.), Karl Bachmaier u. a.: Trudering, Waldtrudering, Riem. Münchens ferner Osten. Volk Verlag, München 2003, .
 Stadtbezirk Trudering-Riem – Informationen für Bürger und Gäste. WEKA-Verlag, Mering 2004, . (online im Webarchiv, PDF; 1,5 MB)
 Brückl, Josef: 1200 Jahre Trudering. Festausgabe zur zwölfhundertjährigen Wiederkehr der ersten urkundlichen Erwähnung. Mit handschriftlicher Widmung vom Autor. Emil Biehl & Söhne (Gesamtherstellung), München 1972.

Statistics 

(As of each 31 December, residents whose main residence)

References

Famous Individuals 
 Ymke de Booij
 Mees Passier

External links 
 www.muenchen.de - Trudering 
 www.muenchen.de - Riem 
 History 
 Abendzeitung 

Boroughs of Munich